Elections were held in New Jersey on Tuesday, November 2, 2010. Primary elections were held on June 8, 2010.

Federal

United States Senate 

Neither Senate seat was up for election in 2010.

United States House 

All 13 New Jersey seats in the United States House of Representatives were up for election in 2010.

State

No state offices were up for election in 2010.

State Senate
On February 19, 2010, Bill Baroni resigned his New Jersey Senate seat to be a member of the Port Authority Board. His resignation triggered a special election for the 14th legislative district, which includes portions of Mercer and Middlesex counties. Democratic Assemblywoman Linda Greenstein was elected over Republican Tom Goodwin, who had been appointed to fill the vacant seat.

Polling

Results

State General Assembly
In the New Jersey General Assembly, the 31st legislative district seat was vacated by Anthony Chiappone on July 20, 2010, after he pled guilty to charges of official misconduct and campaign finance law violations. The Hudson County Democratic Committee selected Jason O' Donnell, a former Democratic county leader, to replace him. O'Donnell was elected to finish the remainder of the term.

Results

Judicial positions
There are no judicial elections in New Jersey.
New Jersey judicial elections, 2010 at Judgepedia

Ballot measures
No measures have been certified for the 2010 statewide ballot, but at least three measures have been proposed by the New Jersey Legislature.
New Jersey 2010 ballot measures at Ballotpedia

Local
Many elections for county offices were also held on November 2, 2010.

References

General Election 2010: Offices and Candidates from the New Jersey State Board of Elections

External links
New Jersey State Board of Elections
U.S. Congress Candidates for New Jersey at Project Vote Smart
New Jersey Election Guide from Congress.org
New Jersey from OurCampaigns.com
New Jersey Polls at Pollster.com
New Jersey at Rasmussen Reports
New Jersey Congressional Races in 2010 campaign finance data from OpenSecrets
New Jersey 2010 campaign finance data from Follow the Money

 
New Jersey